This is a list of  Cathedrals, Churches and Basilica in Mumbai,  The list focuses on the more permanent churches and buildings which identify themselves as places of Christian worship. The denominations appended are those by which they self-identify.

References

churches
 
Mumbai
Mumbai